The David Cohen Prize for Literature (est. 1993) is a  British literary award given to a writer, novelist, short-story writer, poet, essayist or dramatist in recognition of an entire body of work, written in the English language. The prize is funded by the John S. Cohen Foundation and administered by Arts Council England. The writer must be a British or Irish citizen. The winner is chosen by nomination and entries are not required. The prize is valued at £40,000.

In 2005, the David Cohen Prize incorporated the Clarissa Luard Award. The winner of the David Cohen Prize chooses the recipient of the Clarissa Luard Award, valued at £12,500 (funded by the Arts Council of England), and given to a writer under the age of 35 or an organisation that supports young writers. In 2017 Arts Council England launched the Clarissa Luard Award for Independent Publishing, managed by New Writing North, to recognise and celebrate the "adventurousness, innovative spirit and creativity" of independent literary publishing in the UK and Ireland.

List of recipients

 
 1993: V. S. Naipaul
 1995: Harold Pinter
 1997: Muriel Spark
 1999: William Trevor
 2001: Doris Lessing
 2003: Beryl Bainbridge and Thom Gunn (joint winners)
 2005: Michael Holroyd
 2007: Derek Mahon
 2009: Seamus Heaney
 2011: Julian Barnes
 2013: Hilary Mantel
 2015: Tony Harrison
 2017: Tom Stoppard
 2019: Edna O'Brien
 2021: Colm Tóibín

References

External links
The David Cohen Prize for Literature, Arts Council of England, official website

1993 establishments in the United Kingdom
Awards established in 1993
British literary awards
British poetry awards
Literary awards honoring writers